Athleta lutosa is a species of sea snail, a marine gastropod mollusk in the family Volutidae, the volutes.

Description

Distribution

References

 Rosso J.-C. (1985). Description of a new species of Volutocorbis from intertropical Africa: V. emmanuellae n. sp. La Conchiglia. 198-199: 22-23.
 Bail, P & Poppe, G. T. 2001. A conchological iconography: a taxonomic introduction of the recent Volutidae. Hackenheim-Conchbook, 30 pp, 5 pl. (updated October 2008 for WoRMS)
 Aiken R.P. (2010) Volutidae. pp. 314–333, in: Marais A.P. & Seccombe A.D. (eds), Identification guide to the seashells of South Africa. Volume 1. Groenkloof: Centre for Molluscan Studies. 376 pp.

External links
 Herbert, D.G., Jones, G.J. & Atkinson, L.J. (2018). Phylum Mollusca. In: Atkinson, L.J. and Sink, K.J. (eds) Field Guide to the Offshore Marine Invertebrates of South Africa. Malachite Marketing and Media: Pretoria. Pp. 249–320

Volutidae
Gastropods described in 1948